The 1979 Green Bay Packers season was their 61st season overall and their 59th in the National Football League. The team posted a 5–11 record under coach Bart Starr, earning them a fourth-place finish in the NFC Central division. The offense was still one of the worst in the NFL and the defense could not pick up the slack finishing dead last against the run. 

The only notable win the Packers had was a 27-14 victory on a Monday night against the New England Patriots, the first night game at Lambeau Field (previous night games had to be played at Milwaukee County Stadium, since Lambeau Field's original light standards were insufficient for night broadcasts). The Packers also defeated the archrival Minnesota Vikings at home for the first time since 1970.

Offseason

NFL draft

Undrafted free agents

Roster

Regular season

Schedule

Season summary

Week 15: vs. Chicago Bears

Standings

In popular media 
The Packers versus Bears game of week 15 was used in an episode of That '70s Show ("Street Fighting Man") and was part of the seventh season. Eric invites his father, Red, to the game at Lambeau Field. Oddly, the Packers win in this episode, as opposed to real life, where they lost. Eric refers to the Bears as the "underdogs", when the Packers would have likely been the underdogs in the game, since the Packers were 4–10 heading into the game and the Bears were 9–5 heading to the game.

References 

 Sportsencyclopedia.com

Green Bay Packers seasons
Green Bay Packers
Green